Eduardo de Sousa (born 14 December 1943) is a Portuguese former swimmer. He competed in three events at the 1960 Summer Olympics.

References

External links
 

1943 births
Living people
Portuguese male swimmers
Olympic swimmers of Portugal
Swimmers at the 1960 Summer Olympics
Swimmers from Lisbon